Mattie Harper (December 15, 1923 – April 22, 1977) was an American politician who served in the Iowa House of Representatives from the 90th district from 1973 to 1977.

She died of cancer on April 22, 1977, in Rochester, Minnesota at age 53.

References

1923 births
1977 deaths
Democratic Party members of the Iowa House of Representatives
20th-century American politicians